KAPE (1550 AM, "KAPE Radio") is an American radio station licensed to serve the community of Cape Girardeau, Missouri.  The station is owned by Withers Broadcasting and the broadcast license is held by Withers Broadcasting Company of Missouri, LLC.

The station was assigned the call sign "KAPE" by the U.S. Federal Communications Commission (FCC) on March 2, 1987. It was licensed as "KGMO" when it signed on in 1951, and was assigned "KEWI" on April 14, 1986, and "KKPE" on May 1, 1986.

Programming
KAPE broadcasts a news/talk format. The station features programming from Fox News Radio and Salem Media Group. , syndicated programming includes weekday talk shows hosted by Dana Loesch, Dave Ramsey, Glenn Beck, Hugh Hewitt, Joe Pags, John Gibson, and Todd Schnitt.

Legendary radio broadcaster Rush Limbaugh started his career at KGMO in 1967.

Translator
KAPE programming is also carried on a broadcast translator station to extend or improve the coverage area of the station.

References

External links
KAPE official website

APE
News and talk radio stations in the United States
Radio stations established in 1951
Cape Girardeau County, Missouri
1951 establishments in Missouri